The Eternal Question is a lost 1916 American silent drama film drama starring Olga Petrova and directed by Burton L. King. It was produced by the production company known as Popular Plays and Players and released through the newly formed Metro Pictures.

Cast

Olga Petrova - Bianca
Mahlon Hamilton - Ralph Courtland
Arthur Hoops - Grand Duke of Serdian
Warner Oland - Pierre Felix
Edward Martindel - Allen Tait
Henry Leone - Carlo
Howard Messimer - King of Montenaro
Evelyn Dumo - Carlotta

References

External links

1916 films
American silent feature films
Films directed by Burton L. King
Lost American films
Films based on short fiction
Silent American drama films
1916 drama films
American black-and-white films
Metro Pictures films
1916 lost films
Lost drama films
1910s American films
1910s English-language films